Vesa Mäkipää (born 21 January 1965) is a Finnish ski-orienteering competitor and two times winner of the overall world cup.

He won silver medals in both the long and the short course at the 1992 World Ski Orienteering Championships in Pontarlier. He finished first overall in the World Cup in Ski Orienteering in 1995, and again first in 1997.

See also
 Finnish orienteers
 List of orienteers
 List of orienteering events

References

1965 births
Living people
Finnish orienteers
Male orienteers
Ski-orienteers